The politics of the U.S. state of Hawaii typically take place within the framework of a Democrat-dominated government. The Democratic Party in Hawaii was formed in 1900, by supporters of Queen Liliʻuokalani. For the first half of the twentieth century, the Republican Party ruled comfortably, dominating local politics until the end of World War II. After the war, Honolulu police officer John A. Burns began organizing plantation laborers, including many Japanese Americans and Filipino Americans and built a coalition that gradually strengthened the Democratic Party in Hawaii. This culminated in the Hawaii Democratic Revolution of 1954, after which Republican political influence in the islands was greatly diminished.

As a result, Hawaii's congressional politics are typically dominated by Democrats since statehood in 1959. The state has elected just one Republican U.S. senator, Hiram Fong, who served from 1959 to 1977, and two GOP House members. The rest have been Democrats. Only two Republicans have been elected governor, and Linda Lingle was the only one to be re-elected, in 2006. 

Hawaii has supported Democrats in every presidential election in which it has participated, except 1972 and 1984, when incumbent Republican candidates won 49-state landslides. In 2004, John Kerry won the state's 4 electoral votes by a margin of 9 percentage points with 54% of the vote. Every county in the state supported the Democratic candidate. In 2008, Barack Obama won by an overwhelming 45-point lead: 72% for the Democrat and 27% for Republican John McCain. Hawaii is the only actual state that gave either candidate more than 70% of the vote. Obama again won Hawaii by a large margin in 2012, suffering only a small swing against him, winning 71% to 28% for Republican Mitt Romney. Hawaii once again gave a higher vote share to Obama than any of the 49 other states, though on this occasion, Obama's vote was not quite as high as his challenger's best state (Utah, where Mitt Romney polled 73%).

State government

The Hawaii state government is composed of a bicameral system, with the Hawaii senate and the Hawaii House of Representatives making up the upper and lower houses.

Hawaii's Federal Representation
Hawaii is currently represented in the Senate by Democrats Mazie Hirono and Brian Schatz. In the House, Democrats Ed Case (HI-1) and Jill Tokuda (HI-2) represent the state.

Hawaii is part of the United States District Court for the District of Hawaii in the federal judiciary. The district's cases are appealed to the San Francisco-based United States Court of Appeals for the Ninth Circuit.

County government
Each of Hawaii's four counties is governed by a mayor as follows:

City and County of Honolulu - Rick Blangiardi
County of Hawaii - Mitch Roth
County of Maui - Richard Bissen
County of Kauai - Derek Kawakami

Hawaiian nationalism
Hawaiian nationalism is focused on producing a national identity.  Most Hawaiian nationalists have argued that the Hawaiian race and their descendants should govern the islands as a constitutional monarchy.  It is also important to note that Hawaiian nationalism is not limited to Native Hawaiians but have included other groups including whites and Asians such as Walter M. Gibson.

The popular green, red and yellow flag, the Kanaka Maoli flag was designed around the 1990s, probably by Gene Simeona. According to Dr. David Keanu Sai of the University of Hawaiʻi, it had no historical significance before the 1990s, after which it was reported (and widely believed) to be an "original" flag of the Kingdom of Hawaii destroyed by the British. Dr. Sai stated that it was in fact a modern design, part of a "reawakening" of awareness of the Kingdom's history; he added that the present-day Hawaiian state flag was also the Kingdom's flag (in the 19th century), designed by King Kamehameha I.

Most citizens of Hawaii do not share the same sentiments of the sovereignty movement with public opinion seemly be in favor of remaining part of the United States. As of 2014 a poll by the Honolulu Star-Advertiser found that only 6% of respondents supported the creation of a Native Hawaiian nation with 63% being against it.

See also
Political party strength in Hawaii

References

External links
Democratic Party of Hawaii